Ceramide synthase 1 also known as LAG1 longevity assurance homolog 1 is an enzyme that in humans is encoded by the CERS1 gene.

Function 

This gene encodes a member of the bone morphogenetic protein (BMP) family and the TGF-beta superfamily. This group of proteins is characterized by a polybasic proteolytic processing site that is cleaved to produce a mature protein containing seven conserved cysteine residues. Members of this family are regulators of cell growth and differentiation in both embryonic and adult tissues. Studies in yeast suggest that the encoded protein is involved in aging. This protein is transcribed from a monocistronic mRNA as well as a bicistronic mRNA, which also encodes growth differentiation factor 1.

Ceramide synthase 1 (CerS1) is a ceramide synthase that catalyzes the synthesis of C18 ceramide in a fumonisin B1-independent manner, and is primarily expressed in the brain. It can also be found in low levels in skeletal muscle and the testis.
Within the cell, CerS1 is located in the endoplasmic reticulum (ER) and golgi apparatus membrane. CerS1 has two isoforms and isoform 1 may recycle from the golgi to the ER.

CerS1/GDF1 mRNA is strongly expressed in muscle and brain, and was also found in heart and lung. Within the brain, CerS1 is the primary CerS expressed in most neurons. In white matter, it can only be found in low levels.

In an experiment performed in mice in 2012, ablation of neuronal CerS1 decreased levels of sphingolipids, hexosylceramides, and sphingomyelin. Although the brains in these mice appeared to develop normally, researchers observed atrophy of the cerebellum, and Purkinje neurons appeared to degenerate. Granule cells also showed a 6 times increased rate of apoptosis. Behaviorally, the mice expressed motor and neurophysiological impairment.

Structure 

Unlike other mammalian ceramides, CerS1 does not appear to have a Hox-like domain. It is functionally and structurally distinct from other CerS and is found in an entirely different branch of the phylogenetic tree.

Clinical significance 

On application of various stresses, CerS1 turns over rapidly by ubiquitination and proteasomal degradation, suggesting that it has a short half life.

It has been suggested that CerS1 is involved with the regulation of the growth of head and neck squamous cell carcinoma (HNSCC), based on the information that C18 ceramide levels are lower in HNSCC tissues than in normal tissue. CerS1, in particular amongst other CerS, has also been shown to sensitize cells to chemotherapeutic drugs, such as cisplatin, carboplatin, doxorubicin, and vincristine.

References

Further reading

Integral membrane proteins
EC 2.3.1